Arne Thomas (born 1975) is a German chemist who researches porous and nanostructured materials for catalytic applications.

Career
Thomas studied chemistry at the University of Giessen, the University of Marburg, and at the Heriot-Watt University. He conducted his doctoral research under the direction of Markus Antonietti at the Max Planck Institute of Colloids and Interfaces and defended his PhD thesis in 2004. In 2005, following a postdoc position at Galen D. Stucky's lab at the University of California, Santa Barbara, he returned to the Max Planck Institute of Colloids and Interfaces as a group leader. Since 2009, he has been full professor for inorganic chemistry (Functional Materials) at the Technical University of Berlin. Since 2019 he is the spokesperson of the Cluster of Excellence Unifying Systems in Catalysis (UniSysCat).

Awards
 2022, 2020, 2019, 2018, and 2017 Clarivate Highly Cited Researcher
 2019 Hollow Materials Young Innovator Award
 2011 ERC Starting Grant
 2011 Bayer Early Excellence in Science Award
 2004 Georg-Manecke Award (Best PhD Thesis in Polymer Chemistry)

References

External links
 
 Website at TU Berlin
 Website at CoE Unifying Systems in Catalysis (UniSysCat)

Academic staff of the Technical University of Berlin
21st-century German chemists
Living people
1975 births
European Research Council grantees